Liversedge RFC (founded 1877) were a semi-professional rugby league club from Liversedge, Yorkshire, England. They were a founder member of the Northern Rugby Football Union, precursor to the Rugby Football League.

History

Early Days 

Liversedge was founded in 1877.

After the 1890-91 season, Liversedge along with other Yorkshire Senior clubs Batley, Bradford, Brighouse, Dewsbury, Halifax, Huddersfield, Hull, Hunslet, Leeds,  Manningham and Wakefield decided that they wanted their own county league starting in 1891 along the lines of a similar competition that had been played in Lancashire. The clubs wanted full control of the league but the Yorkshire Rugby Football Union would not sanction the competition as it meant giving up control of rugby football to the senior clubs. The club played in the Yorkshire Senior competition in the early 1890s.

Northern Union 

Prior to the great schism in rugby, Liversedge, like many other clubs from Yorkshire (and Lancashire), had suffered punishment by the Rugby Football Union for "broken time" payments. As a result, Liversedge, represented by a Mr. J. H. Hampshire, attended a meeting at the George Hotel, Huddersfield, together with the representatives of 21 other clubs, and agreed to form a Northern Rugby Football Union.

Liversedge thereby became one of the founder members of the new league. In the first season, 1895–96, the league consisted of 22 clubs and Liversedge finished in 15th position. In season 1896–97, the league was divided into Yorkshire and Lancashire, Liversedge playing in the former section, where they would stay for the remainder of their semi-professional existence. They did slightly better, finishing in 11th position out of 16 teams. In the following four seasons (1897–98, 1898–99, 1899–1900, 1900–01), still in the Yorkshire section, they finished bottom in every season except 1898–99, when they managed to finish second bottom, in each case out of the 16 clubs.

In their final season, 1901–02 they yet again won the wooden spoon, finishing 14th out of 14 teams with only six points. They dropped out of the league after the end of the 1901–02 season..

Successor clubs 

Although Liversedge RFC were founder members of the Rugby League, the town does not have the rugby league heritage of other towns in the area. Following the demise of the original club, an Association Football club, Liversedge F.C., was founded in its stead in 1910, one of a number of instances of code switching around that time. 

Today the town is represented by Liversedge ARLFC who play at Primrose Lane (off Bradford Road) in the Third Division of the Pennine Amateur Rugby League.

Notable players 

Harry Varley (25 November 1867 – 21 November 1915) played rugby union for England v Scotland in 1892 while with Liversedge. He went on to play under the new code for Liversedge and Oldham.

Robert "Bob" Wood (born 1873) played rugby union for England v Ireland in 1894 and at club level for Liversedge.

Statistics

Club Records

Club Trophies 

Liversedge did not win any trophies, although reached the final of the Yorkshire Challenge Cup in 1888–89 during their rugby union days. They lost 18–16 to Otley (1 goal, 1 try, 4 minors to 1 goal, 0 tries, 4 minors).

League Record (incomplete) 

 League points: for win = 2; for draw = 1; for loss = 0
 Only limited County League information is available for this season

Fixtures & Results (incomplete) 
The following are a selection of Liversedge's fixtures from the seven seasons in which they played semi-professional Rugby League:

 
Folly Fields was the stadium used by Wigan at the time until 1901. They then became sub-tenants of Springfield Park See below – Note 3. 
 Lowerhouse Lane is the original site of the current ground used by Widnes. It was renamed Naughton Park in 1932 in honour of club secretary, Tom Naughton – and later renamed Halton Stadium after being completely rebuilt in 1997.
 Wigan became sub-tenants of Springfield Park, which they shared with Wigan United AFC, playing their first game there on 14 September 1901 at which a crowd of 4,000 saw them beat Morecambe 12–0, and the last game on 28 April 1902 when Wigan beat the Rest of Lancashire Senior Competition. A temporary ground was necessary to span the period between moving from Folly Fields and the new ground at Central Park being constructed.
 CC Rx: Challenge Cup Round x; YC Rx: Yorkshire Cup Round x; YSC: Yorkshire Senior Competition
 Only limited County League information is available for season (1901–02)

See also 
British rugby league system
The Great Schism – Rugby League View
The Great Schism – Rugby Union View
Rugby league county leagues
List of defunct rugby league clubs 
Liversedge sporting history

References 

Rugby league teams in West Yorkshire
Defunct rugby league teams in England
Sport in Kirklees
Rugby clubs established in 1877
Rugby clubs disestablished in 1902
Founder members of the Northern Rugby Football Union
English rugby league teams
1877 establishments in England